Syed Meeraj (born 29 December 1973) is an Indian former cricketer. He played seven first-class matches for Hyderabad between 1993 and 1998.

See also
 List of Hyderabad cricketers

References

External links
 

1973 births
Living people
Indian cricketers
Hyderabad cricketers
Cricketers from Hyderabad, India